Born Pink World Tour is the ongoing second worldwide concert tour headlined by South Korean girl group Blackpink in support of their second Korean studio album Born Pink. The tour began on October 15, 2022 in Seoul, South Korea and is set to conclude on June 17, 2023 in Sydney, Australia. Upon conclusion, the tour will have visited 21 countries in four continents.

Background 
On July 6, 2022, YG Entertainment confirmed that Blackpink would release new music and embark on the largest world tour by a K-pop girl group in history later in the year. On July 31, it was revealed that the group's second Korean studio album Born Pink would be released in September, followed by the world tour starting in October. On August 8, Blackpink announced 36 shows from October 2022 to June 2023 spanning Asia, North America, Europe, and Oceania, with additional dates to be added in the future. On September 6, the group unveiled the full run of dates and venues for the North American and European legs of the tour. On October 6, Blackpink released two teaser images of the tour's visual setup, one featuring a black space with clouds of white smoke, and the other featuring a garden-like setting. The tour kicked off with two concerts on October 15 and 16, 2022 at the KSPO Dome in Seoul, South Korea, which recorded an attendance of over 20,000 people. On October 28, the group revealed the full list of dates and venues for the Asia leg of the tour. On December 7, Blackpink announced four dome concerts in two cities in Japan, Tokyo and Osaka. On January 9, 2023, Blackpink announced four additional shows for the Asia leg of the tour in Singapore, Macau and Kaohsiung. On January 31, Blackpink announced ticketing details for the concerts in Australia and that the originally announced Auckland concert was no longer feasible due to "unforeseen logistical challenges." It was also announced that Blackpink will tour for the first time in Mexico City.

Production 
According to the tour's creative director Amy Bowerman, the show was conceived as a celebration of Blackpink's dual identity as well as the individuality of its members. Split into four acts, the opening act takes place in an enchanted garden and showcases Blackpink's feminine side. Bowerman describes it as a "woodland, nymph-esque world where it’s very flirty and feminine." However, the floral scenes hint at the group's darker side, with grotesque imagery such as a lily leaking metallic liquid and dark music. The second act leans more into the mature aspect of Blackpink, featuring a "heavy monochrome that’s very harsh and powerful." The group's new single "Pink Venom" was intended to be the focal point of the show "at the heart of everything." At the end of the second act, it is used as the turning point at which the color pink first appears in the production and is used heavily thereafter. The third act highlights each member's individuality with solo stages, described as having a "weird trippy mix" of colors. Finally, the fourth act celebrates Blackpink's  concept as a whole, with imagery of various dichotomies such as water and earth or fire and ice shown continually.

In May 2022, YG Entertainment approached Ceremony London, a visual production company that has worked with renowned artists such as Post Malone, Rina Sawayama, Holly Humberstone and Dua Lipa, and asked them to help produce the show, providing the music and choreography of Born Pink in order to do so. The production of the show was a collaboration between many influences — YG's fully-female production team, the group's American band and music director, and Ceremony London. Bowerman describes the evolution of the show's concept as an organic process. As Blackpink prepared the show in music rehearsals, they determined which songs fit together and moved them around in the setlist, which resulted in changes to the visuals, the group's movements, and the stage. However, "Pink Venom" always remained the center point of the show's narrative. Blackpink themselves were heavily involved in the show and provided their input, especially with the music. Fan interactions were also considered during the making of the show, with time allotted for Blackpink to spend time with and engage with their fans, known as Blinks.

Concert synopsis 
The concert begins with a video segment displayed on the main stage's screen of Blackpink in an enchanted garden before the group rises from below the stage and begins performing. For the opening act, the backdrop invokes the garden with green and blue colors while Blackpink performs, starting with the hard-hitting songs "How You Like That", "Pretty Savage", and "Whistle" in a row. Following this, the members take a break to introduce themselves and interact with the audience. The next portion of the setlist showcases the softer side of the group with the songs "Don't Know What to Do" and "Lovesick Girls", after which the members depart the stage for a costume change. 

The second act of the concert begins with a black-and-white video segment of Blackpink posing in shimmery dresses in a dystopian-like setting. The group returns on stage with the song "Kill This Love", followed by "Crazy Over You", "Playing with Fire", and "Tally". The stage features a stark monochromatic backdrop as the members perform these songs. Blackpink then begin the song "Pink Venom", at which point the stage explodes in color from monochrome to pink. After performing "Pink Venom", the members depart the stage for a costume change. A remix of "Pink Venom" plays as the backup dancers hold a dance battle on stage, which is followed by guitar, bass, drum, and keyboard solos by the band.

The third act of the concert features solo performances by each member of Blackpink. Before each member's solo stage, their name appears on the main stage screen. Jisoo commences the solo performances with a cover of Camila Cabello's song "Liar". For the first show in Los Angeles, she is joined by Cabello to perform the song together. The second solo stage is by Jennie, who performs the unreleased song "You & Me". Her partnered dance routine is complemented by dimmed lighting and the duo’s silhouettes being projected onto a backdrop. The third solo stage is by Rosé, who sings "Hard to Love" and "On the Ground". Finally, Lisa dances to a shortened version of "Lalisa". She follows this up with a pole dance routine before performing "Money" with an extended dance break.

The fourth act of the concert is preceded by a video segment of Blackpink in vibrant settings such as outer space and a tundra, after which they return on stage with the songs "Shut Down" and "Typa Girl". They pause to interact with the audience and teach the key choreography for the next song. Blackpink goes on to perform "Ddu-Du Ddu-Du", which features an extended dance break. The last song in the set is "Forever Young". Afterwards, Blackpink bids their goodbyes and departs the stage.

Blackpink finally returns on stage for an encore, now wearing casual t-shirts and sweatshirts from their tour’s merchandise line. They perform "Yeah Yeah Yeah" and ask the audience to pick their next song. On different dates, Blackpink performs "Stay" or "Boombayah" and sometimes both. During the encore, the members each take a side of the stage to dance with the crowd and play with the cameras. Finally, Blackpink ends the concert with "As If It's Your Last" and say goodbye to the audience before exiting on a lift lowering them off stage.

Reception 
The tour was met with positive reception from critics. Writing for Evening Standard, Ali Shutler gave the O2 Arena concerts five out of five stars, calling it "cherry-picked from a range of familiar genres to create something fresh and throughout the show, it felt like the four performers continued pop’s long-standing legacy of girl power"; for The Guardian, Alexis Petridis gave the same concerts four out of five stars, regarding it as "exceptionally well made and high-impact.".

Set list
This set list is from the concert on October 16, 2022, in Seoul. It is not intended to represent all shows from the tour.

Act 1
The Enchanted Garden Interlude
1. "How You Like That"
2. "Pretty Savage"
3. "Whistle" (shortened)
4. "Don't Know What to Do"
5. "Lovesick Girls"
Act 2
Interlude I (contains elements of "Kill This Love")
6. "Kill This Love"
7. "Crazy Over You"
8. "Playing with Fire" (shortened)
9. "Tally"
10. "Pink Venom" (extended)

Act 3 – Solos
Interlude II
11. "Liar" (Camila Cabello cover) (Jisoo solo)
12. "You & Me" (Jennie solo)
13. "Hard to Love" (Rosé solo; shortened)
14. "On the Ground" (Rosé solo; shortened)
15. "Lalisa" (Lisa solo; shortened)
16. "Money" (Lisa solo; contains elements of "Lalisa")
Act 4
Interlude III
17. "Shut Down" 
18. "Typa Girl"
19. "Ddu-Du Ddu-Du"
20. "Forever Young"
Encore
21. "Boombayah"
22. "Yeah Yeah Yeah"
23. "Stay" (remixed version)
24. "As If It's Your Last"

Notes
 During the second show in Newark, Jisoo performed her solo cover of "Liar" last after the solo stages of Jennie, Rosé, and Lisa.
 During the first show in Los Angeles, Camila Cabello joined Jisoo on stage to perform "Liar" together.
 During the show in Amsterdam, Blackpink performed their cover of "Last Christmas" during the encore.

Tour dates

Cancelled shows

Notes

References 

Blackpink concert tours
2022 concert tours
2023 concert tours
Concert tours of North America
Concert tours of the United States
Concert tours of Canada
Concert tours of Oceania
Concert tours of Europe
Concert tours of Australia
Concert tours of Asia
Concert tours of South Korea
Concert tours of the United Kingdom
Concert tours of Spain
Concert tours of Germany
Concert tours of France
Concert tours of Denmark
Concert tours of the Netherlands
Concert tours of Thailand
Concert tours of Hong Kong
Concert tours of Malaysia
Concert tours of Indonesia
Concert tours of Taiwan
Concert tours of the Philippines
Concert tours of Japan
Concert tours of Mexico
Concert tours of the United Arab Emirates